The 1974 Detroit Lions season was the 45th season in franchise history. It was the Lions' final season playing at Detroit's Tiger Stadium; the team moved to the Pontiac Silverdome the following season and played home games there until the end of the 2001 season. 

Prior to the start of training camp, tragedy would strike the Lions, as head coach Don McCafferty died of a heart attack at age 53. He was replaced by Lions assistant Rick Forzano, who guided the Lions to a 7–7 record in their final season at Tiger Stadium. 

This would also be the last season until 2011 when Monday Night Football aired in the City of Detroit as a result of the Lions playing in Pontiac from 1975 to 2001, followed by subpar seasons while playing home games at Ford Field during that stadium’s first eight seasons.

NFL draft

Notes 

  Detroit traded TE Dave Thompson and its first-round pick (13th) to New Orleans in exchange for the Saints' first-round pick (8th) and sixth-round pick in 1975.
  Detroit traded DT Joe Schmiesing to Baltimore in exchange for the Colts' fourth-round pick (84th), and then traded this pick back to the Colts a few weeks later in exchange for K (and occasional WR) Jim O'Brien.
  Detroit traded its fourth-round pick (91st) to St. Louis in exchange for CB Miller Farr.
  Detroit traded LB Ed Mooney to Baltimore in exchange for the Colts' fifth-round pick (109th), and then traded this pick to Atlanta in exchange for DB Willie Germany.
  Detroit traded LB Adrian Young to New Orleans in exchange for the Saints' sixth-round pick (139th).
  Detroit traded its ninth-round selection (221st) to Los Angeles in exchange for G Brian Goodman.

Roster

Regular season

Schedule

Note: Intra-division opponents are in bold text.

Game summaries

Week 7

Week 8

Standings

See also
 1974 in Michigan

References

Detroit Lions on Pro Football Reference
Detroit Lions on jt-sw.com
Detroit Lions on The Football Database

Detroit Lions
Detroit Lions seasons
Detroit Lions